Ghori, (also Ghouri,Gouri) pathans originating from the Ghor region of present-day central Afghanistan came to Indian peninsula during the successive Muslim invasions of the 11th and 12th centuries AD, forming a part of the Afghan armies of Mahmud of Ghazni and Muhammed Ghori. Gradually over the centuries they settled in leading cities of subcontinent. With their martial background, like other pathans, they were in great demand as soldiers and mercenaries for different principalities. The city of Meerut, in Indian state of Uttar Pradesh, has been said to be the earliest settlement of the Pashtuns in North India, and the Ghauris have been settled there for at least eight hundred years. Other Pathan tribes in the district include the Kakar, Bangash, Tareen and Afridi. In Lahore, a historic cultural center of wider Punjab region, Ghauris settled within the confines of Mochi Gate, which itself is marred form of Urdu word “Morchi” meaning “Trench Soldier” different streets (Mohallahs) still bear their old names like Mohalla Teer-garan (arrow craftsmen), Mohalla Kaman-garan (bow craftsmen) etc. Even today we find bazaars on the same names. This is further supported by remnants of graves as old as six hundred years in Miani Sahib’s Graveyard, the oldest graveyard in the city. Some instances of migration from India to various areas of Pakistan at the time of partition of 1947 have also been observed.

Moving on-wards from 11th and 12th century, successive generations have homogenized within the regional culture. They use Khan or Ghauri or Khan Ghauri as their surname. Today Ghauris are a widely spread community of people not only in Afghanistan but also present day Pakistan and India In india the are found in Rajasthan,Uttar Pradesh and places nearby Delhi because they first settled in Delhi and then the moved further into neighboring places.In Rajasthan they are in Jayal and Didwana tehsils of Nagaur District but they are now absorbed into muslim rajput communities like Deshwali,Qaimkhani due to marital relations into communities mentioned above. (majorly northern parts) perfectly assimilated into the local culture. Thus spread over a vast geographical area and riven by socio-economic, political, tribal and linguistic differences, nevertheless sharing a unique sense of common identity.

References 

Pashtun people
Sindhi tribes
Pashtun tribes
Layyah District
Urdu-language names
Pashtun diaspora in India
People from Ghor Province
Ghurid dynasty